The Taipei Taiwan Temple is the 31st operating temple of the Church of Jesus Christ of Latter-day Saints (LDS Church), and is located in Taipei City, Taiwan.

Missionaries from the LDS Church first came to Taiwan in 1956. The Taipei Taiwan Temple was announced in 1981 and church leaders decided to build on the site of the mission home in the center of Taipei.
 
On November 17, 1984, Gordon B. Hinckley dedicated the Taipei Taiwan Temple. There are four ordinance rooms and three sealing rooms.

In 2020, the Taipei Taiwan Temple was closed temporarily during the year in response to the coronavirus pandemic.

See also

 Comparison of temples of The Church of Jesus Christ of Latter-day Saints
 List of temples of The Church of Jesus Christ of Latter-day Saints
 List of temples of The Church of Jesus Christ of Latter-day Saints by geographic region
 Temple architecture (Latter-day Saints)
 The Church of Jesus Christ of Latter-day Saints in Taiwan

References

External links
 
Taipei Taiwan Temple Official site
Taipei Taiwan Temple at ChurchofJesusChristTemples.org

20th-century Latter Day Saint temples
Religious buildings and structures completed in 1984

Temples (LDS Church) in Asia
The Church of Jesus Christ of Latter-day Saints in Taiwan
1984 establishments in Taiwan